Costa-Gavras is a Greek-French film director, screenwriter and producer. Most of Gavras' films have been made in French; however, six of them were made in the English language.

Films

Short films

As a producer

Additional credits

Acting appearances

See also
 List of awards and nominations received by Costa-Gavras

Sources
 
 
 Costa-Gavras at UniFrance (in French)
 Costa-Gavras at AlloCiné (in French)

Director filmographies
French filmographies